The 12827 / 28 Howrah–Purulia Express is a Superfast Express train of Indian Railways – South Eastern Railway zone that runs between  and  in India.

It operates as train number 12827 from Howrah Junction to Purulia Junction and as train number 12828 in the reverse direction, serving the state of West Bengal.

Coaches

The 12827 / 28 Howrah–Purulia Express presently has two AC Chair Cars, two Second Class Reserved seating, 9* General Unreserved, and 1 EOG and 1 LHB Seating cum Luggage Rake (LWSLR) coaches. It does not carry a pantry car.

As with most trains in India, coach composition is changed at the discretion of Indian Railways depending on demand.

Service

The 12827 Howrah–Purulia Express covers the distance of 323 kilometres in 05 hours 30 mins (58.73 km/hr) & in 05 hours 50 mins as 12828 Purulia–Howrah Express (55.37 km/hr).

As the average speed of the train is above , as per Indian Railways rules, its fare includes a Superfast surcharge.

Routing

The 12827 / 28 Howrah–Purulia Express leaves Howrah Junction at 16:50 every day. The return train leaves Purulia Junction at 05:30 and reaches Howrah at 11:20.

Traction

As the route is fully electrified, a -based WAP-7 powers the train for its entire journey.

Timings

12828 Purulia–Howrah Express leaves Purulia Junction on a daily basis at 05:30 hrs IST and reaches Howrah Junction at 11:20 hrs IST the same day.

12827 Howrah–Purulia Express leaves Howrah Junction on a daily basis at 16:50 hrs IST and reaches Purulia Junction at 22:10 hrs IST the same day.

References

External links

Rail transport in Howrah
Express trains in India
Rail transport in West Bengal